Vladimir Bodescu (4 March 1868, Durleşti village, Russian Empire – 28 November 1941, Gulag, penitentiary No. 4, in Chistopol, TASSR) was a Bessarabian politician and lawyer who was part of the Moldovan Parliament from Bessarabia. He was one of the many victims of Soviet communism.

Biography

Education, Sfatul Țării
He was a graduate of the Law Faculty of Kiev, being a lawyer. He was a magistrate in several localities in Russia, a prosecutor at the General Prosecutor's Office in Chișinău. Member of the Labor Party.
He served as Member of the Moldovan Parliament (1917–1918).
On 27 March 1918 he voted for the Union of Bessarabia with Romania.

Victim of Soviet Communism
He was arrested on 10 August 1940, after occupying Bessarabia by the USSR. He died of exhaustion in 1941.

Gallery

Bibliography
Gheorghe E. Cojocaru, Sfatul Țării: itinerar, Civitas, Chişinău, 1998, 
Mihai Taşcă, Sfatul Țării şi actualele autorităţi locale, "Timpul de dimineaţă", no. 114 (849), June 27, 2008 (page 16)

External links
Arhiva pentru Sfatul Tarii
Deputaţii Sfatului Ţării şi Lavrenti Beria

Notes

1868 births
1941 deaths
Politicians from Chișinău
People from Kishinyovsky Uyezd
Moldovan MPs 1917–1918
Prisoners who died in Soviet detention